Harbison Crossroads is an unincorporated community of Knox County, Tennessee, United States, located approximately 10 miles Northeast of Knoxville. It is also referred by the unofficial name of Gibbs.

History
The area known today as Harbison Crossroads/Gibbs was first discovered by American Revolutionary War veteran James Harbison, who settled the area in the 1790s and operated a toll gate at the crossroads of Emory Road and Tazewell Pike.

Nicholas Gibbs, settled in the area following Harbison in a log cabin. Gibbs would later be used as the name of the area following Harbison Crossroads. The different names of the area has led to confusion, as state and county maps designate the area as Harbison Crossroads, and public schools located within the community are named for Gibbs, including Gibbs Elementary, Middle and High schools.

Geography
The location of Harbison Crossroads today aligns with the intersection of State Route 131 and State Route 331 and known locally as East Emory Road and Tazewell Pike.

Economy
Several gas stations, restaurants, a grocery store and Rural/Metro Fire Station are all found in Harbison Crossroads.

Education
Gibbs High School, Gibbs Middle School and Gibbs Elementary School are all located on Tazewell Pike, just north of the crossroads.

References

External links 
 Nicholas Gibbs Historical Society of Tennessee

Unincorporated communities in Tennessee
Unincorporated communities in Knox County, Tennessee
Knoxville metropolitan area

es:Corryton
vo:Corryton